Kathleen Lynch may refer to:

 Kathleen Lynch (cyclist) (born 1957), New Zealand mountain biker
 Kathleen Lynch (politician) (born 1953), Irish politician
 Kathleen Lynch (performer), American performance artist
 Kathleen Lynch (academic) (born 1951), Irish sociologist and activist

See also
 Kathleen Lynn (1874–1955), Irish physician and politician